Fritz Klotzsch (16 May 1896 – 9 January 1971) was a German film producer and production manager. He was head of production at Bavaria Film for two years.

Selected filmography
 All for Love (1933)
 So Ended a Great Love (1934)
 Tomfoolery (1936)
 The Broken Jug (1937)
 The Muzzle (1938)
 Die Entlassung (1942)
 My Wife Theresa (1942)
 The Court Concert (1948)
 The Divorcée (1953)
 Marili (1959)
 The Hunchback of Soho (1966)
 Dr. Fabian: Laughing Is the Best Medicine (1969)
 The Man with the Glass Eye (1969)

References

Bibliography
 Giesen, Rolf. Nazi Propaganda Films: A History and Filmography. McFarland, 2003.

External links

1896 births
1971 deaths
German film producers
Film people from Berlin